No. 6 Squadron, nicknamed the Antelopes, is a transport squadron of the Pakistan Air Force. It is the PAF's oldest squadron which is currently based at Nur Khan Air Base and operates the C-130 & CN-235 transport aircraft.

History
The squadron was formed without any aircraft or equipment on 14 August 1947 at Maripur, Karachi, under its first commanding officer, Flight Lieutenant M. J. Khan. On 16 August 1947, Air Officer Commanding Air Vice Marshal visited the squadron and commissioned it for heavy airlifting and airborne operations. The PAF acquired a Douglas DC-3 Dakota aircraft on 22 October 1947 and later obtained Bristol Freighter, Tiger Moth, and Auster AOP.9 aircraft. On 29 June 1948, a detachment of the squadron provided a guard of honour at Mauripur for Governor-General Muhammad Ali Jinnah on his arrival from Quetta. On 9 September 1948, three Dakota aircraft performed a flypast at the Quaid-e-Azam's funeral ceremony.

Operational History

Second World War 

The Squadron's Hawker Hurricanes were deployed for operations at British Burma during fighting with Japanese forces.

1st Kashmir War 

During the 1947 war, the squadron carried out regular supply drops in Azad Kashmir for troops and villages that had been cut off by snow. Dakota pilots had to fly between the region's mountains, because their fully loaded aircraft had a ceiling of around 10,000 ft, while the surrounding mountain peaks were 16,000–20,000 ft high. In November 1948 the squadron dropped 40,000 kg of supplies while operating from Risalpur and Peshawar. On 4 November 1948, a Dakota was attacked by two Hawker Tempest fighters of the Indian Air Force, but Flying Officer Mukhtar Dogar managed to evade the fighters.

The RPAF purchased a large number of Bristol Freighter transports for No. 6 Squadron in early 1950. The Freighter's fuel capacity enabled the squadron to fly longer transport and communication sorties. Some of the Freighters were modified in 1955 to carry a  "block-buster" bomb under each wing, and limited training in night bombing was undertaken. Similar operations occurred later with the C-130 Hercules. Freighters would be used in varying climatic and geographical conditions, such as the snowbound mountains in Kashmir, the southern Punjabi deserts, and East Pakistan's tropical forests. The 1952 floods led to the unit's deployment for large-scale food supply drops, for which the squadron received an award on 17 August 1952, from the Governor of the Punjab. "Operation Snow Drop" began on 15 November 1953, and involved dropping supplies in Pakistan's Northern Areas from PAF Base Chaklala. From 15 to 30 November 1953, the Antelopes flew 780 hours and dropped 363,000 kg of supplies. Replacement of the Bristol Freighter began in 1963 with the delivery of four Lockheed C-130B Hercules transports, which enabled the squadron to fly over the Karakoram mountains rather than between them, thus improving flight safety.

Indo-Pakistani War of 1965 

In the 1965 Indo-Pakistani War the Antelopes dropped parachute commandos into Indian territory in a night-time mission involving three C-130B transports.
Just before the 1965 war started, the squadron's commanding officer, Wing Commander Eric Gordan Hall, had the idea of making up for the PAF's deficiency in heavy bombers by modifying the Hercules to carry bombs. It was converted to carry 10,000 kg of bombs, which were rolled out on pallets from the rear ramp, and over 21 night-time bombing raids were flown against Indian forces approaching for the Battles of Chawinda and Pul Kanjari. Support missions for troops in the Northern Areas were continued after the war.

1971 East Pakistan Crisis 

With the unstable political situations at the end of 1970 and the resulting civil unrest, the Antelopes moved a large number of troops to East Pakistan and assisted in flood relief operations there. India stopped the PAF flying over its territory in 1971, and the squadron had to fly to East Pakistan via Sri Lanka. Two of the unit's C-130 transports were deployed to Dhaka from March 71 until the 1971 Indo-Pakistani War began on 3 December 1971. They were used to evacuate soldiers and civilians from hostile areas of East Pakistan – in one sortie a single C-130 evacuated 365 people from Sylhet to Dhaka. During the 1971 war, No. 6 Squadron flew bombing missions from West Pakistan in the same manner as those flown during the 1965 war, and no transport aircraft were lost during these sorties.

The squadron was regularly involved in "Exercise Nejat", a series of CENTO exercises held at PAF Base Masroor, Rezayiah, in Iran, Turkey, and England.

War On Terror 

The squadron participated extensively during Operation Zarb e Azb.

The bomber squadron saw aerial action during the 1992–96 civil war in Afghanistan. In September 1995, Afghan insurgents attacked and destroyed the Pakistani embassy in Afghanistan, leaving one person killed and dozens injured, including the ambassador. On 7 September 1995, a C-130 aircraft was sent to Kabul for the recovery and evacuation of the embassy staff. The Pakistan Army and Navy dispatched commandos belonging to SSG(N), SSG Division, and the 50th Airborne Division. The aircraft landed in very hostile conditions, but the crew managed to evacuate everyone within half an hour.

In 2009, the squadron performed hundreds of airborne missions, including some begun by the Pakistan Army. They parachuted hundreds of Pakistani paratroopers into the Swat Valley and took part in operations in South Waziristan. During Operation Black Thunderstorm, Operation Rah e Raast, and Operation Rah-e-Nijat, the squadron parachuted thousands of Pakistani troops and flew continuously, day and night.

Royal International Air Tattoo 

The No. 6 Squadron has participated in the British RIAT on various occasions.

Aircraft Flown

Gallery

See also
List of Pakistan Air Force squadrons

References

Pakistan Air Force squadrons